S R Vijayakumar (b 1974) is an Indian politician and Member of Parliament elected from Tamil Nadu. He is elected to the Lok Sabha from Chennai Central constituency as an Anna Dravida Munnetra Kazhagam candidate in 2014 election.

References 

All India Anna Dravida Munnetra Kazhagam politicians
Living people
India MPs 2014–2019
Lok Sabha members from Tamil Nadu
1974 births
Politicians from Chennai